Brigadier-General Sir Herbert Conyers Surtees  (13 January 1858 – 18 April 1933) was a British military leader, politician and historical author.

Early life
He was born in London on 13 January 1858. He was the only son of Col. Charles Freville Surtees DL JP (1823–1906) of the 10th Hussars and his wife, Bertha Chauncey. He was christened in St James' Church in Paddington. He was descended from Robert Surtees of Mainsforth. His father was MP for South Durham 1865 to 1868.

He was educated at Harrow School and the Royal Military College, Sandhurst, before entering the British Army in 1876, joining the 49th Regiment of Foot. In October 1877, he transferred to the Coldstream Guards and remained with them for the rest of his career.

Career
He worked initially as a "musket instructor". From 1884 to 1887 he was posted in Egypt. He was promoted to Captain in 1887 and Major in 1895.  He mainly served with the Coldstream Guards he rose to the rank of Brigadier General.  He saw action as a Lt. Colonel in from 1899 to 1900 South Africa (during the Boer War).

In 1899, he saw action at the Siege of Kimberley, Belmont, Enslin, the Modder River, Magersfontein, and the Orange Free State. In 1900 he saw action at Driefontein, the Vet River, the Zand River and Belfast. For these numerous actions he received the Queen's South African Medal with six clasps (indicating seven awards). He also received the DSO.

In 1904, he was promoted to Brevet Colonel and served as a military attache in Constantinople and Athens.  He retired in 1912, but came out of retirement due to the First World War commanding the 52nd Infantry Brigade in France and Belgium.

Political career
He lived at Mainsforth Hall (inherited from his father) near Ferry Hill in County Durham.

A notable freemason he was created Provincial Grand Master for Durham in October 1932 and Provisional Prior of the Knights Templar in  November 1932.

Personal life

In 1887 he married Madeline Augusta Crabbe (d. 1957), daughter of Edward Crabbe and his wife Ruth Herbert, a stage actress and the artist's model to Dante Gabriel Rossetti. Together, Madeline and Herbert had two daughters:

 Dorothy Cynthia Surtees (1890–1957), who married Christopher Cecil Tower. After his death, she married Sir Patrick Ramsay, the second son of John Ramsay, 13th Earl of Dalhousie and a brother-in-law of Princess Patricia of Connaught (through her husband Sir Alexander Ramsay).
 Etelka Bertha Surtees (1891–1974), who married the American diplomat Edward J. Bell (1882–1924), nephew of the publisher James Gordon Bennett Jr., in 1914. After his death in Peking (while acting Minister to China when Minister Jacob Gould Schurman was in Washington) in 1924, she remarried to Sir James Leishman Dodds (1891–1972), a son of Under-Secretary of State for Scotland Sir James Miller Dodds, in Paris in 1927. During World War II, Dodds was the British Minister to Bolivia.

He died in London on 18 April 1933 after an operation. His widow, a recipient of Turkish Order of the Chefaket, died in 1957. After Lady Surtees' death, their granddaughter Virginia inherited Mainsforth Hall and changed her name to Surtees in 1962.

Descendants
Through his daughter Dorothy, he was a grandfather of David Patrick Maule Ramsay (1919–1978), who married (and divorced) Hélène Arvanitidi, and James Surtees Maule Ramsay (1923–1944), a Lt. in the Scots Guards who died in the Netherlands at the Western Front during World War II.

From his daughter Etelka's first marriage, he was a grandfather of noted society hostess and writer Evangeline Bell (1914–1995), who married David K. E. Bruce (a son of U.S. Senator William Cabell Bruce, he served as the U.S. Ambassador to France, the Federal Republic of Germany, and the United Kingdom), and Virginia Bell (1917–2017), who married (and later divorced) Sir Henry Ashley Clarke, the British Ambassador to Italy. From his Etelka's second marriage, he was a grandfather of Josephine Leishman Dodds (b. 1928), who married Squadron Leader Hugh Glyn Laurence Arthur Brooking (1914–2000) in 1949. Brooking, the King's Messenger, a younger son of Hugh Cyril Arthur Brooking.

Legacy and honours
He was knighted by King George V in 1932.  After his death, a memorial plaque was erected in the cloister of Durham Cathedral to his memory. His portrait is held by Darlington Library.

Publications
The History of the Church of St Brandon in Brancepeth, County Durham (1919)
The History of the castle of Brancepeth, County Durhanm (1920)
The History of Newton Cap, County Durham (1922)
The History of New Shildon and East Thickley, County Durham (1923)
The History of the Parishes of St John's Chapel and Heathery Cleugh (1925)
Records of the Family of Surtees (1925)
The History of Durham Castle (1928)
The History of Brancepeth (1930)
The History of the Parishes of Thornley and Tow Law
The Heraldry of the Cloisters of Durham Cathedral (1930)
Memorial Inscriptions in Durham Cathedral (1932)

References

1858 births
1933 deaths
People educated at Harrow School
English Freemasons
British historians
British Army generals of World War I
Coldstream Guards officers
Conservative Party (UK) MPs for English constituencies
UK MPs 1918–1922
49th Regiment of Foot officers
Graduates of the Royal Military College, Sandhurst
British Army personnel of the Second Boer War
Knights Bachelor
Companions of the Order of the Bath
Companions of the Distinguished Service Order
Companions of the Order of St Michael and St George
Members of the Royal Victorian Order